The 2013 Hong Kong Open Superseries is a top level badminton competition which took place from November 19, 2013 to November 24, 2013 in Kowloon, Hong Kong. It was the twelfth BWF Superseries competition on the 2013 BWF Superseries schedule. The total purse for the event is $350,000. A qualification round was held for all five disciplines.

Men's singles

Seeds

  Lee Chong Wei
  Chen Long
  Kenichi Tago
  Du Pengyu
  Tommy Sugiarto
  Jan Ø. Jørgensen
  Nguyen Tien Minh
  Boonsak Ponsana

Top half

Bottom half

Finals

Women's singles

Seeds

  Li Xuerui
  Ratchanok Intanon
  Wang Yihan
  Wang Shixian
  Sung Ji-hyun
  Juliane Schenk
  Saina Nehwal
  Tai Tzu-ying

Top half

Bottom half

Finals

Men's doubles

Seeds

  Muhammad Ahsan / Hendra Setiawan
  Hiroyuki Endo / Kenichi Hayakawa
  Liu Xiaolong / Qiu Zihan
  Kim Ki-jung / Kim Sa-rang
  Lee Sheng-mu / Tsai Chia-hsin
  Cai Yun / Fu Haifeng
  Chai Biao / Hong Wei
  Angga Pratama / Ryan Agung Saputro

Top half

Bottom half

Finals

Women's doubles

Seeds

  Wang Xiaoli / Yu Yang
  Christinna Pedersen / Kamilla Rytter Juhl
  Misaki Matsutomo / Ayaka Takahashi
  Pia Zebadiah Bernadeth / Rizki Amelia Pradipta
  Bao Yixin / Tang Jinhua
  Duanganong Aroonkesorn / Kunchala Voravichitchaikul
  Poon Lok Yan / Tse Ying Suet
  Aprilsasi Putri Lejarsar Variella / Vita Marissa

Top half

Bottom half

Finals

Mixed doubles

Seeds

  Zhang Nan / Zhao Yunlei
  Tantowi Ahmad / Lilyana Natsir
  Xu Chen / Ma Jin
  Joachim Fischer Nielsen / Christinna Pedersen
  Chan Peng Soon / Goh Liu Ying
  Sudket Prapakamol / Saralee Thoungthongkam
  Praveen Jordan / Vita Marissa
  Markis Kido / Pia Zebadiah Bernadeth

Top half

Bottom half

Finals

References

Hong Kong
2013 in Hong Kong sport
Hong Kong Open (badminton)